Felt 2: A Tribute to Lisa Bonet is the second studio album by Felt, an American hip hop duo made up of Murs and Slug. It is a concept album meant as a tribute to actress Lisa Bonet. Produced by Ant, it was released by Rhymesayers Entertainment in 2005. It peaked at number 12 on the Billboard Heatseekers Albums chart, as well as number 21 on the Independent Albums chart.

Critical reception
Tom Breihan of Pitchfork gave the album a 7.7 out of 10, saying: "Other than a couple of throwaway skits where they talk condescendingly to girls on the phone, Felt 2 is pretty great."

Track listing

Personnel
Credits adapted from liner notes.

 Murs – vocals
 Slug – vocals
 Ant – production
 Brett Johnson – bass guitar (3)
 Nate Collis – guitar (3, 6, 12, 15), vocals (14)
 Erick Anderson – keyboards (12, 15)
 Joe Mabott – engineering, mixing, mastering
 Ian Campbell – engineering assistance, mixing assistance
 Aaron Farley – layout, design
 Dan Monick – layout, design, photography

Charts

References

External links
 

2005 albums
Murs (rapper) albums
Rhymesayers Entertainment albums
Albums produced by Ant (producer)
Sequel albums
Tribute albums to non-musicians